Claudin-11 is a protein that in humans is encoded by the CLDN11 gene. It belongs to the group of claudins and was the first member of the family to be knocked out in mice, thereby demonstrating the central role of claudins for intramembranous strands observed in freeze-fracture images.

Function 

The protein encoded by this gene belongs to the claudin family of tight junction associated proteins and is a major component of central nervous system myelin that is necessary for normal CNS function, hearing, and spermatogenesis. There is growing evidence that the protein determines the permeability between layers of myelin sheaths and, with its expression highly regulated during development, may play an important role in cellular proliferation and migration. In addition, the protein is a candidate autoantigen in the development of autoimmune demyelinating disease. Finally, experiments in Cldn11-null mice demonstrate that behavioral phenotypes in open field tests, as well as  defects in sound lateralization, accompany changes in neurotransmitter levels in the amygdala/ventral hippocampus and auditory brainstem. This study reveals a molecular mechanism by which changes to myelin membrane properties in the absence of degenerative pathology, could lead to neuropsychiatric disease in humans.

References

Further reading

External links